Nicol Mostert (born 5 February 1985) is a South African rugby union footballer.   He plays either as a flanker or eighthman.   He represents the Pumas in the Currie Cup and Vodacom Cup.

External links 

itsrugby.co.uk profile

Living people
1985 births
South African rugby union players
Rugby union flankers
People from Roodepoort
Pumas (Currie Cup) players
Rugby union players from Gauteng